Mengla dianlovirus (MLAV, also written Měnglà virus) is a type of filovirus identified in a Rousettus bat in Mengla County, Yunnan Province, China, and was first reported in January 2019.  It is classified in the same family as Ebolavirus and Marburgvirus.

It is the only member of the genus Dianlovirus. Neither the species nor the genus are listed in the 2018 ICTV classification, as the virus was formally described after that report was released. A formal proposal was submitted for the taxa in January 2019.

References

Filoviridae
Bat virome